Leopold II of Lippe (Paul Alexander Leopold; 6 November 1796 – 1 January 1851) was the sovereign of the Principality of Lippe. He succeeded to the throne in 1802, and in 1820 he assumed control of the government from his mother, who had been acting as regent due to his youth at accession.

Biography
Leopold II was born in Detmold, the eldest child of Leopold I, the reigning prince of Lippe and his consort Princess Pauline of Anhalt-Bernburg (1769–1820). He succeeded as Prince of Lippe on his father's death on 5 November 1802. As he was just six years old, his mother Princess Pauline acted as regent until 3 July 1820, when he assumed control of the government. During the regency, his mother had introduced a constitution in 1819 which created an assembly which at the time had more executive powers than any other assembly in Germany.

In 1825, he constructed a Court Theatre. Among those to perform at the theatre were Albert Lortzing and Ludwig Devrient, who were employed there from 1826 to 1833.

In the last years of his reign, the revolutions of 1848 broke out across all of Germany. Following his death in Detmold, he was succeeded on the throne by his eldest son Leopold III.

Marriage and children
Prince Leopold was married in Arnstadt on 23 April 1820 to Princess Emilie of Schwarzburg-Sondershausen (1800–1867), a daughter of Günther Friedrich Karl I, Prince of Schwarzburg-Sondershausen, and Princess Caroline of Schwarzburg-Rudolstadt. They had nine children:

Leopold III, Prince of Lippe (1821–1875), married to princess Elisabeth of Schwarzburg-Rudolstadt (1833–1896) on 17 April 1852.
Princess Luise of Lippe (1822–1887)
Woldemar, Prince of Lippe (1824–1895), married to princess Sophie of Baden (7 August 1834 – 6 April 1904) on 9 November 1858.
Princess Friederike of Lippe (1825–1897)
Prince Friedrich of Lippe (1827–1854)
Prince Hermann of Lippe (1829–1884)
Alexander, Prince of Lippe (1831–1905)
Prince Karl of Lippe (1832–1834)
Princess Pauline of Lippe (1834–1906)

Ancestry

References

 

 
 
 

1796 births
1851 deaths
House of Lippe
Princes of Lippe
Modern child monarchs